Kansas City Barbeque Society is a competitive cooking organization based in Kansas City, Missouri, famous for Kansas City BBQ. It is the largest competitive barbecue organization in the world, with more than 15,000 members. It was founded in 1985 by Carolyn and Gary Wells and Rick Welch.  Their desire was to put together a local group for competitive barbecue.  It has since grown exponentially and provides oversight to hundreds of competitions.

Competitions
The Kansas City Barbeque Society is the official sanctioning body of competitive barbeque cooking. Each year, KCBS sanctions more than 300 competitions across the country and has over 15,000 members that consist of Certified BBQ Judges (CBJ's), cook teams, contest reps, contest organizers and all around lovers of great food and community.

Competitions are usually coordinated in conjunction with a local festival or events and most often linked to fundraising effort for local, regional and national causes.  Teams typically begin to arrive on a Thursday or Friday morning and set up their equipment and share quality time with their "BBQ Family".  Competitors will begin to cook on Friday evening and then throughout the night with a turn in for the various smoked meats some time in the early afternoon on Saturday. The four standard turn in for KCBS cook teams are Chicken, Pork Ribs, Pork Shoulder or Boston Butt and Beef Brisket.

Events usually have a cash prize of varying amounts and trophies.  Quite often these events draw crowds of spectators numbering in the thousands, and depending on the prize amount, they will draw competitors from several states. KCBS has over the 30+ years of operation become the "biggest and best" in BBQ and sets the standard for competitive food events around the world.

KCBS along with sanctioning competitive food events in the BBQ segment have recently added an entire "Grilling" or cooked over open flame focus in a division of their organization. The National Grilling Society is a division of KCBS that focuses on grilled or cooked over flame competitive food events that do not focus on the traditional four KCBS meats. Some popular choices are Steak, Hamburger, Chicken Wings, Pork Chop, etc.  KCBS is the largest competitive food sanctioning body in the world with a presence all over the globe.

Many large retail brands support KCBS in their efforts and have been a contributing factor to the explosive growth and massive presence. These include Igloo Coolers, Reynolds Wrap, Royal Oak Charcoal, Blue Rhino Propane, Cabo Wabo Tequila, BBQ Guru, McCormicks Grillmates and spices, French's, Franks Hot Sauce, Lawry's Compart Duroc Pork, Bass Pro Shops, Cabela's and so many more household names.

Certified Barbeque Judges
As the sanctioning body of competitive barbeque, the Kansas City Barbeque Society employs a blind judging process at all official contests. In order to become a Certified Barbeque Judge, one must be at least 16 years of age and attend one of the hundreds of Certified Barbeque Judge classes held each year.

A Certified Barbeque Judge attains the status of Master Certified Barbeque Judge after participating in 30 contests, cooking with a competition team, and passing an online exam.

Judges at all sanctioned Kansas City Barbecue Society competitions take a judges' oath authored by renowned judge Ardie Davis.

Judge's Oath:

Civil suit and member issues
KCBS was found to have breached a contract with their Marketing Company.

See also
 American Royal

References

External links
 

Organizations based in Kansas City, Missouri
Barbecue
Cuisine of the Midwestern United States
Culture of Kansas City, Missouri
Smoked meat
1985 establishments in Missouri